The Patuxent Branch Trail is a  trail in Howard County, Maryland, United States.  It mostly runs along the path of the Patuxent River, just south of Maryland Route 32.

References

 Rail-Trails Mid-Atlantic: Covers Trails in Delaware, Maryland, Virginia ... - Google Books

Rail trails in Maryland
Hiking trails in Maryland